Celastrina acesina is a species of butterfly of the family Lycaenidae. It is found in south-eastern Papua New Guinea.

References

Butterflies described in 1906
Celastrina